Gerda-Maria Jürgens (10 May 1917 – 2 December 1998) was a German actress. She appeared in more than 90 films and television shows between 1952 and 1998.

Selected filmography
 The Night Before the Premiere (1959)
 Revenge of the East Frisians (1974)

References

External links

1917 births
1998 deaths
German film actresses
Actresses from Gdańsk